Albhutha Dweepu is a 2005 Indian Malayalam-language fantasy film directed by Vinayan. The plot is set on an otherworld island where all men are dwarfs and women are of normal height, and humans are considered monsters. The film stars Prithviraj Sukumaran and Guinness Pakru alongside Mallika Kapoor, Jagathy Sreekumar, Jagadish, Indrans, Kalpana, Ponnamma Babu and Bindu Panicker in supporting roles.

Pakru who played prince Gajendran made an entry into the Guinness Book of Records for being the shortest actor (76 cm height) to play a full-length character in a film. It was also given an entry into the Guinness Book of Records for casting the most dwarves in a single film.

Plot
An island is inhabited by dwarves. All the men are dwarves, although the women are of a normal height. The ruler of the island, King Valiyavamana Thirumanassu invites various princes to his capital city of Vamanapuri in order to compete for the hands of his five daughters. Four of his daughters are successfully engaged, but the youngest princess, Radha, has no wish to get married. Nonetheless, decides to have her engaged to Prince Gajendran, his nephew and heir, who is in love with Radha. In order to celebrate the engagements, the king orders a week of celebration.

Meanwhile, two men Gautham and Mohammed who work for the Indian Navy, wash up on the shore. They are killed by Gajendran and the island's inhabitants who believe them to be demons. Hari, Madhavan, Joseph and Chandrappan who also work for the Indian Navy are also trapped on the island. They witness the death of their comrades and flee from the dwarves. They decide to take refuge in an old temple in the forest.

The princess go along with Mallika, their handmaiden to the temple of their god, Gandharvan, in order to pray. Mallika is secretly the king's mistress although they are both terrified that one of the king's two wives would find out about the affair. On the way, the princesses and Mallika come across Devamma, a wisewoman. Devamma tells them about Gandharvan. A thousand years ago, Gandharvan fell in love with the king's daughter. The daughter's suitor came to know of this and planned to use black magic to kill Gandharvan. However the daughter stole the magic and gave it to Gandharvan. In his anger, Gandharvan cursed all the men on the island to become dwarfs. In addition, he decreed that any man to step inside his temple would have his head explode. Out of gratitude to the king's daughter, Gandharvan agreed to protect the island for a thousand years. Devamma cautions them that the thousand years has elapsed, making the island vulnerable once more.

When Mallika offers food as a sacrifice to Gandharva, Hari and his friends eat it without Mallika's knowledge, making her believe that Gandharvan ate the offering. While exploring the temple, Radha comes across Hari in the temple and believes due to his height that he is the real Gandharvan. Both of them fall in love with each other at the first sight. Hari begs Radha not to reveal their hiding place. Radha agrees and comes by herself later with food. As Radha exits the temple she is caught by Gajendran. Gajendran asks why she is at the temple at such a late hour. To avoid being caught, Radha tells Gajendran that Gandharvan appeared in one of her dreams and summoned her to the temple. She then feigns illness. The royal priest tells the king to host a puja in order to exorcise Gandharvan.

Gajendran, angry at what he perceives as Gandharvan possessing Radha, decides to enter the Temple to find out the truth only to be frightened by the disguised Hari. Radha tells Mallika about the men and she agrees to help them. They come up with a scheme for the men to hide in plain sight. The men disguise themselves as saints who pretend to heal Radha. They all finds that Madhavan is lookalike of the king. Out of gratitude, the king makes them the official royal priests. However the king discovers that Hari and his friends are imposters. Hari and his friends kidnap the king and hide him in a barrel while they figure out what to do.

In the king's absence, Gajendran takes the throne. He becomes suspicious of Hari and Radha and orders the saints to crown him as the king so that he can marry Radha. During Gajendran's coronation ceremony, the king escapes. When he comes there and sees Gajendran in his place, he thinks that Gajendran teamed up with them to kidnap the king so that he can be the king. But Gajendran manages to tell that he did it so that he can marry Radha. The king then reveals the truth about the saints and Radha helped them to hide. They all think that Hari was planning to seduce her. The king orders the death sentence of Hari and his friends. They four tries to escape but fails.

When the dwarfs are about to execute the death sentence they are attacked by gigantic cannibals who attack and kill most of the men. Hari and his friends escapes with the permission of the king and then defeat the cannibals, thus saving the kingdom. The king forgives them and allows them to sail to their homeland with Radha. But he refuses and gives her to them so that the kingdom would have the princess. When they were about to leave, Gajendran stops them and tells that first he thought that in their world they had only dwarves as human beings but now he realised that they are nothing to the god and even now he has a human's heart even though the god cursed them. Gajendran then handsover Radha to her Gandharvan Hari. Then they all leaves with her.

Cast
Prithviraj Sukumaran as Hari, a Navy Officer
Guinness Pakru as Prince Gajendran
Mallika Kapoor as Princess Radha, Princess of Vamanapuri
Jagathy Sreekumar as Madhavan, a Navy Officer and  Valiyavamana Thirumanassu (Madhulan), Maharaja of Vamanapuri 
Jagadish as Joseph, Navy Officer 
Indrans as Chandrappan, a Navy officer 
Kalpana as Mallika; Chief Maid of the court
Ponnamma Babu as Maharani Arundhati; first wife of the king
Bindu Panicker as Maharani Anasuya; second wife of the King
Sajan Sagara as Ittunnan
Valsala Menon as Devamma, an extraordinary old lady
Sonika as Rajkumari Indumathi 
Renjusha Menon as Rajkumari Lakshmi
Vettoor Purushan as Rajaguru of Athbutha Dweepu
Mela Raghu as Village Chief of Vamanapuri
Manuraj as Gautham, a Navy Officer (cameo)
Baburaj as Mohammed, a Navy Officer (cameo)
Balakrishnan as Vakraraja Odiyan 
Kamaraddin as a cannibalistic giant
Thumboor Shibu as cannibalistic giant

Tamil version
Karunas as Karuppiah
Vaiyapuri as Vaiyapuri
Manivannan as Maharaja 
Malavika as Malavika (special appearance)

Soundtrack
The soundtrack was composed by M. Jayachandran and the lyrics were written by Kaithapram Damodaran Namboodiri.
Oridathorida - Jyotsna, Vidhu Pratap
Chakkaramavinte - Alex
Shyama Mohini - Madhu Balakrishnan, Chithra
Hey Raja - Alex, Nishad

Tamil version
Lyrics were written by Pazhani Bharathi and Pa. Vijay.
Oridathil - Tippu, Binni Krishnakumar
Saama Mohini - Madhu Balakrishnan, Sujatha
Hey Raja - Alex, Nishad
Sakkarakatti - Alex
Chinna Machan - Pushpavanam Kuppusamy, Rimi Tommy

Release
The film was a 2005 commercial box-office success. The film was dubbed in Tamil as Arputha Theevu with additional scenes reshot with Manivannan, Karunas and Vaiyapuri with an additional item number picturised on Malavika. The Tamil version was released in 2007. Manivannan played Jagathi's part of dwarf king in Tamil.

Vinayan said that American director Ron Howard has showed interest in remaking the film in English, and they have contacted him for a discussion. The further developments is unknown.

References

External links
 

2005 films
2000s Malayalam-language films
Indian fantasy films
Works about dwarfism
Films directed by Vinayan
Films scored by M. Jayachandran
2005 fantasy films